Torontoceros ("horn of Toronto") was an extinct genus of deer, nicknamed the Toronto subway deer. It lived in the Late Pleistocene (around 12,000 - 11,000 years ago) in Ontario while likely being native elsewhere. The sole species is T. hypogaeus.

Discovery
The fossils of this animal were found in 1976, during the excavations for the construction of the Toronto subway's Bloor–Danforth line, before being donated to the Royal Ontario Museum.<ref>Sellers, Daniel. 4-5-2012. Prehistoric Toronto: The Torontoceros. torontoist.com. Torontoist.</ref> The fossils included part of a skull with fragments of antlers still attached, part of the rib cage and a femur.

The genus' binomial name comes from the Greek words for below and earth, as it was found several metres underground.

DescriptionTorontoceros is known from an incomplete skeleton, however it is sufficient enough to hypothesise its appearance. This animal is believed to have been as large as a current caribou, and the appearance was also reminiscent of it. The large antlers, however, appear to have been much larger and heavier than those of the present forms. The surface of the pedicles indicates that the Torontoceros specimen had died in the spring, when the antlers were still covered with velvet and not yet fully developed.

ClassificationTorontoceros was a member of the Capreolinae subfamily of deer in the tribe Rangiferini, although it is unclear what its closest relationships were.

Paleoecology
Fossil pollen found on the site indicate that Torontoceros lived in an environment consisting of deciduous forests and coniferous forests, at the end of the last ice age. It is likely that this animal lived side by side with the first North American humans, the Paleo-Indians. Some footprints found in 1908 during other works, just 300 meters from the place where Torontoceros'' was found indicate the presence of the oldest humans in North America; unfortunately the footprints were destroyed.

References

Capreolinae
Prehistoric deer
Prehistoric even-toed ungulate genera
Pleistocene even-toed ungulates
Pleistocene genus extinctions
Pleistocene first appearances
Fossils of Canada
Paleontology in Ontario
History of Toronto
Fossil taxa described in 1982